James Alexander Philip Theo Mountbatten-Windsor, Earl of Wessex (born 17 December 2007), styled Viscount Severn until 2023, is the younger child and only son of Prince Edward, Duke of Edinburgh, and Sophie, Duchess of Edinburgh. He is the youngest grandchild of Queen Elizabeth II and Prince Philip, Duke of Edinburgh, and the youngest nephew of King Charles III. He is 14th in the line of succession to the British throne.

Birth and baptism
James was born on 17 December 2007, at Frimley Park Hospital in Frimley, Surrey. His full name, James Alexander Philip Theo, was announced on 21 December.

He was baptised on 19 April 2008, in the Private Chapel of Windsor Castle by David Conner, the dean of Windsor, and his godparents were Alastair Bruce of Crionaich, Duncan Bullivant, Thomas Hill, Denise Poulton and Jeanye Irwin. He wore a newly made replica of the royal christening gown originally used by Victoria, the eldest child of Queen Victoria, in 1840. It has been worn for most royal christenings since then, and the original gown has now been preserved.

Education
, James attended Eagle House School, a coeducational preparatory school near Sandhurst in Berkshire.

Official appearances
In April 2015, James and his sister, Lady Louise, participated in their first overseas engagement by accompanying their parents on a trip to South Africa. In September 2020, James participated in the Great British Beach Clean with his family at Southsea Beach in Hampshire, in support of the Marine Conservation Society.

In March 2022, James attended the memorial service for Prince Philip, Duke of Edinburgh. In June 2022 he attended the Platinum Jubilee National Service of Thanksgiving and the Platinum Party at the Palace.

On 17 September 2022, during the period of official mourning for Queen Elizabeth II, James joined his sister and six cousins to mount a 15-minute vigil around the coffin of the late Queen, as it lay in state at Westminster Hall. On 19 September, he joined other family members at the state funeral.

Titles, styles, and honours

Titles and styles

From his birth until March 2023, James was styled as Viscount Severn, a courtesy title that was his father's subsidiary title. The title Viscount Severn is derived from the Welsh roots of Sophie's family. Letters patent issued in 1917 assign a princely status and the style of Royal Highness to all children of a monarch's sons. When his parents married, Buckingham Palace announced that their children would be styled as the children of an earl, rather than as prince or princess. In 2020, his mother stated that James and his sister Louise retained their royal titles and styles and could make a choice on whether to use them from the age of 18.

On the creation of his father as Duke of Edinburgh on 10 March 2023, James became styled with the courtesy title of Earl of Wessex, that title now being the most senior subsidiary title of his father. As the Dukedom of Edinburgh is a life peerage, James will not inherit it upon his father's death. He is, however, heir apparent to his father's hereditary peerages: Earl of Wessex, Earl of Forfar, and Viscount Severn.

Honours

  6 February 2012: Queen Elizabeth II Diamond Jubilee Medal
  6 February 2022: Queen Elizabeth II Platinum Jubilee Medal
In June 2008, to recognise a visit by his father to the Canadian province of Manitoba, the Lieutenant Governor of Manitoba named a lake in the north of the province after James.

References

2007 births
Living people
21st-century English people
English Anglicans
English people of Danish descent
English people of German descent
English people of Greek descent
English people of Russian descent
English people of Scottish descent
Courtesy earls
James
James, Viscount Severn
James
People educated at Eagle House School
People educated at St George's School, Windsor Castle
People from Bagshot
People from Frimley
James, Viscount Severn
James